Nou Sam is a Cambodian politician. He belongs to the Cambodian People's Party and was elected to represent Oddar Meancheay Province in the National Assembly of Cambodia in 2003.

References

Members of the National Assembly (Cambodia)
Living people
Cambodian People's Party politicians
Year of birth missing (living people)
Place of birth missing (living people)